Iréna Mayeska (June 30, 1934 – 2009) was a Polish-born Canadian actress.

Biography
Mayeska was born on June 30, 1934 and educated at Ontario's Queen's University at Kingston. She studied with the Canadian Theatre School in Toronto and since then has appeared in many stage and television productions. She was a member of the Stratford Festival company in 1955, and has worked in England and Canada. Irena began her acting career under her real name, since mid-1950s she began to use the stage name Iréna Mayeska.

Personal life
She was married to actor Leslie Lawton.

Partial filmography
 1963 Drylanders as Thora
 1963 The Incredible Journey as Mrs. Nurmi
 1964 Joey (short)
 1976 Partners as Aunt Margot
 1978 Drága kisfiam! as Maude Chalmers
 1980 The Courage of Kavik the Wolf Dog as Edna Hunter
 1981 Just Jessie as Mrs. Brown
 1981 The Amateur as Woman Clerk

References

External links
 

1934 births
2009 deaths
Canadian stage actresses
Canadian film actresses
Canadian television actresses
20th-century Canadian actresses